Brandon Luke Jack (born 25 May 1994) is an Australian author, journalist and former professional footballer who played for the Sydney Swans in the Australian Football League (AFL).

As a youngster Jack played for Westbrook Junior AFL club. Jack then went on to play for Pennant Hills. Jack's older brother Kieren Jack also played for the Swans and his father Garry Jack is a former rugby league footballer and coach.
 At the conclusion of the 2017 season, he was delisted by Sydney. 

Jack currently writes for the Sydney Morning Herald. After having previously enrolled in a law double degree, Jack studied a Bachelor of Arts, majoring in sociology with a minor in creative writing at UNSW, completing his studies in 2022.

In 2021, Jack released his memoirs, titled ‘28’.

Statistics
 Statistics are correct to the end of the 2017 season

|- style="background-color: #EAEAEA"
! scope="row" style="text-align:center" | 2013
|
| 33 || 9 || 7 || 5 || 40 || 28 || 68 || 11 || 20 || 0.8 || 0.6 || 4.4 || 3.1 || 7.6 || 1.2 || 2.2
|-
! scope="row" style="text-align:center" | 2014
|
| 33 || 8 || 3 || 3 || 29 || 32 || 61 || 12 || 23 || 0.4 || 0.4 || 3.6 || 4.0 || 7.6 || 1.5 || 2.9
|- style="background:#eaeaea;"
! scope="row" style="text-align:center" | 2015
|
| 33 || 10 || 6 || 5 || 66 || 60 || 126 || 26 || 31 || 0.6 || 0.5 || 6.6 || 6.0 || 12.6 || 2.6 || 3.1
|-
! scope="row" style="text-align:center" | 2016
|
| 33 || 0 || — || — || — || — || — || — || — || — || — || — || — || — || — || —
|- style="background:#eaeaea;"
! scope="row" style="text-align:center" | 2017
|
| 33 || 1 || 0 || 0 || 2 || 7 || 9 || 3 || 5 || 0.0 || 0.0 || 2.0 || 7.0 || 9.0 || 3.0 || 5.0
|- class="sortbottom"
! colspan=3| Career
! 28
! 16
! 13
! 137
! 127
! 264
! 52
! 79
! 0.6
! 0.5
! 4.9
! 4.5
! 9.4
! 1.9
! 2.8
|}

References

External links

Living people
1994 births
Sydney Swans players
Australian rules footballers from New South Wales
Pennant Hills Australian Football Club players
People educated at Oakhill College